Angels' Wild Women (originally titled Screaming Angels) is a 1972 biker film written and directed by cult director Al Adamson. Preceded by Satan's Sadists (1969) and Hell's Bloody Devils (1970), it is the last in a trio of (unrelated) motorcycle gang films directed by Adamson for Independent-International Pictures Corp., a company he co-founded with Sam Sherman. The plot centers on a group of tough biker babes who leave their cycle gang boyfriends to go on a violent rampage. When a cult leader kills one of the girls, the others go out for revenge.

Premise
A group of good motorcyclists fight against an evil hippie cult based on the murderous Charles Manson "family".

Cast
 Ross Hagen – Speed
 Kent Taylor – Parker
 Preston Pierce – Turk
 Regina Carrol – Margo
 William Bonner – King
 Arne Warde – Slim
 Jill Woelfel – Donna (as Jill Woefel)
 Vicki Volante – Terry
 Albert Cole – Weasel
 Claire Polan – Love Child
 John Bloom – Big Foot
 Gus Peters – Preacher
 Linda Gordon – Sue
 Eric Lidberg – Freak
 Margo Hope – Orphan Girl
 Gil Serna - Biker
 Gary Kent - Rapist #1

Production
Scenes were filmed at the Spahn Ranch where the Manson cult had lived and some former Manson associates appeared as extras. After the film was completed, the producers could not distribute the film due to the dissipation of the biker-gang trend. According to Sherman (Filmfax #28), "...overnight, the motorcycle trend dropped dead. I don't know why, but it just died. You couldn't give away a motorcycle picture." The popularity of Roger Corman's The Big Doll House, a violent women in prison film with Pam Grier, led to a reshoot. New scenes were added featuring tough, aggressive female bikers and a Pam Grier lookalike was added to the cast. The reworked and retitled film turned out to be a big box office success for the studio.

The film is distributed by Troma Entertainment.

See also
 List of American films of 1972

References

External links
 

1972 films
1972 crime films
American independent films
Outlaw biker films
Troma Entertainment films
Films directed by Al Adamson
1972 independent films
1970s English-language films
1970s American films
American crime films